In applied mathematics, the Kaplan–Yorke conjecture concerns the dimension of an attractor, using Lyapunov exponents. By arranging the Lyapunov exponents in order from largest to smallest , let j be the largest index for which

and

Then the conjecture is that the dimension of the attractor is

This idea is used for the definition of the Lyapunov dimension.

Examples 
Especially for chaotic systems, the Kaplan–Yorke conjecture is a useful tool in order to estimate the fractal dimension 
and the Hausdorff dimension of the corresponding attractor.

In this case, we find j = 1 and the dimension formula reduces to

 

The resulting Lyapunov exponents are {2.16, 0.00, −32.4}. Noting that j = 2, we find

References

Dimension
Dynamical systems
Limit sets
Conjectures